Om Bikram Bista is popular musician, singer and composer of Nepalese music field. He is son of writer Daulat Bikram Bista. He is considered "King of Pop" in Nepal. He competed in "All Nepal Music Competition" at the age of 10 years. He also participated in Melancholy song by 365 Artists is set in Guinness World Records, is written, music composed and directed by Environmentalist Nipesh DHAKA.

Discography

References

21st-century Nepalese male singers
20th-century Nepalese male singers
1955 births
Living people

ne:ओम विक्रम विष्ट